Assault on Dome 4 is a 1996 American science-fiction film directed by Gilbert Po and starring Joseph Culp, Bruce Campbell, Jocelyn Seagrave, and Brion James. The film was written by Hesh Rephun.

Premise
Intergalactic extremist Alex Windham (Bruce Campbell) has seized control of Dome 4, a scientific outpost on another planet, after escaping from a penal colony on Mars. Windham is forcing the staff of Dome 4 to construct new weapons that he can use to destroy his enemies, but he doesn't know that one of his captives is the wife of interstellar lawman Chase Moran (Joseph Culp) — and Moran will allow no harm to come to his wife.

Cast
 Joseph Culp as Chase Moran (Peace Keeper)
 Bruce Campbell as Alex Windham
 Jocelyn Seagrave as Lily Moran (Chase's Wife)
 Brion James as Chairman
 Ray Baker as Dan Block, Chief of Staff
 Jack Nance as Mellow (Dome 4 Oldtimer)
 Mark Bringleson as Sigmund (Windham Henchman)
 James Lew as Quaid (Windham Henchman)
 Jay Arlen Jones as Goon #1
 Rudolf Weber as Goon #2
 Matthew Chontos as Goon #3 / Peace Keeper #3
 Shawn Hoffman as Peace Keeper #1
 Brandon Scott Peterson as Peace Keeper #2
 Michael Auteri as Bob Bowen (Dome 4 Administrator)
 B.J. Barie as JD

External links

Assault on Dome 4 Film Review

1996 films
1990s science fiction action films
1996 independent films
Films about terrorism in the United States
American independent films
Films about hostage takings
1990s English-language films
Films set in Los Angeles
American science fiction action films
1990s American films